The list of ship launches in 1889 includes a chronological list of some ships launched in 1890.



References

Sources

1888 in transport
 
1888